Heiner Fleischmann (2 February 1914 — 25 December 1963) was a German motorcycle racer before and after World War II.

Fleischmann raced mainly for the NSU company.

Career 
 1936 German champion in the 350 cc category on an NSU.
 1937 German champion in the 350 cc category on an NSU.
 1939 European champion in the 350 cc category on a DKW, German champion in the 350 cc category on a DKW.
 1950 German champion in the 350 cc category on an NSU.

Further reading

External links 
 Heiner Fleischmann, eine deutsche Radsportlegende aus Amberg (in German)

1914 births
1963 deaths
German motorcycle racers
People from Amberg
Sportspeople from the Upper Palatinate